Fabrice Salanson (17 November 1979 – 3 June 2003) was a French road cyclist. He was considered to be a very promising talent before his death in 2003.

During his short career, he most notably won a stage of the 2002 Grand Prix du Midi Libre and a stage of the 2000 Tour de l'Avenir. He also rode in the 2001 Giro d'Italia, but did not finish.

Death
On 3 June 2003 he was found dead next to his bed in his hotel in Dresden the morning before the Tour of Germany. The race was still held, but his team, chose not to race.

Forensics revealed that Salanson died of a heart attack. No indications of doping were found. However, an electrocardiogram from three weeks before Salanson's death later surfaced, showing an interruption during a strenuous test of maximum effort. While this was abnormal, it did not explain his death.

Major results
1997
 1st Chrono des Nations Juniors
 1st La Bernaudeau Junior
1999
 8th Paris–Roubaix Espoirs
2000
 1st Stage 3 Tour de l'Avenir
 7th Grand Prix de Villers-Cotterêts
2001
 7th Tour du Haut Var
2002
 1st Stage 2 Grand Prix du Midi Libre
2003
 4th A Travers le Morbihan

References

External links

1979 births
2003 deaths
French male cyclists
People from Montereau-Fault-Yonne